

X-1D pilots

X-1D flights

See also
 Bell X-1

Flight lists